The 1983–84 NBA season was the Bucks' 16th season in the NBA. For the first time since 1974-75 season, Brian Winters was not on the opening day roster.

Draft picks

Roster

Regular season

Season standings

z – clinched division title
y – clinched division title
x – clinched playoff spot

Record vs. opponents

Game log

Playoffs

|- align="center" bgcolor="#ccffcc"
| 1
| April 17
| Atlanta
| W 105–89
| Sidney Moncrief (19)
| Paul Mokeski (9)
| Sidney Moncrief (6)
| MECCA Arena10,107
| 1–0
|- align="center" bgcolor="#ccffcc"
| 2
| April 19
| Atlanta
| W 101–87
| Marques Johnson (27)
| Alton Lister (10)
| Sidney Moncrief (7)
| MECCA Arena11,052
| 2–0
|- align="center" bgcolor="#ffcccc"
| 3
| April 21
| @ Atlanta
| L 94–103
| Marques Johnson (28)
| Johnson, Lanier (10)
| three players tied (3)
| Omni Coliseum5,395
| 2–1
|- align="center" bgcolor="#ffcccc"
| 4
| April 24
| @ Atlanta
| L 97–100
| Junior Bridgeman (20)
| Sidney Moncrief (13)
| Mike Dunleavy (6)
| Omni Coliseum6,435
| 2–2
|- align="center" bgcolor="#ccffcc"
| 5
| April 26
| Atlanta
| W 118–89
| Sidney Moncrief (20)
| Bob Lanier (11)
| Sidney Moncrief (8)
| MECCA Arena11,052
| 3–2
|-

|- align="center" bgcolor="#ffcccc"
| 1
| April 29
| New Jersey
| L 100–106
| Marques Johnson (23)
| Bob Lanier (10)
| Marques Johnson (8)
| MECCA Arena11,052
| 0–1
|- align="center" bgcolor="#ccffcc"
| 2
| May 1
| New Jersey
| W 98–94
| Sidney Moncrief (28)
| Sidney Moncrief (8)
| Johnson, Pressey (5)
| MECCA Arena11,052
| 1–1
|- align="center" bgcolor="#ccffcc"
| 3
| May 3
| @ New Jersey
| W 100–93
| Sidney Moncrief (27)
| Alton Lister (12)
| Moncrief, Johnson (4)
| Brendan Byrne Arena15,868
| 2–1
|- align="center" bgcolor="#ffcccc"
| 4
| May 5
| @ New Jersey
| L 99–106
| Sidney Moncrief (26)
| Sidney Moncrief (9)
| Bob Lanier (7)
| Brendan Byrne Arena14,623
| 2–2
|- align="center" bgcolor="#ccffcc"
| 5
| May 8
| New Jersey
| W 94–82
| Marques Johnson (22)
| Lister, Lanier (10)
| Paul Pressey (7)
| MECCA Arena11,052
| 3–2
|- align="center" bgcolor="#ccffcc"
| 6
| May 10
| @ New Jersey
| W 98–97
| Marques Johnson (25)
| Marques Johnson (23)
| Sidney Moncrief (7)
| Brendan Byrne Arena15,283
| 4–2
|-

|- align="center" bgcolor="#ffcccc"
| 1
| May 15
| @ Boston
| L 96–119
| Marques Johnson (18)
| Bob Lanier (11)
| Marques Johnson (4)
| Boston Garden14,890
| 0–1
|- align="center" bgcolor="#ffcccc"
| 2
| May 17
| @ Boston
| L 110–125
| Marques Johnson (29)
| Sidney Moncrief (7)
| three players tied (4)
| Boston Garden14,890
| 0–2
|- align="center" bgcolor="#ffcccc"
| 3
| May 19
| Boston
| L 100–109
| Sidney Moncrief (22)
| Paul Mokeski (12)
| Sidney Moncrief (6)
| MECCA Arena11,052
| 0–3
|- align="center" bgcolor="#ccffcc"
| 4
| May 21
| Boston
| W 122–113
| Paul Pressey (22)
| Mokeski, Lister (9)
| Bob Lanier (8)
| MECCA Arena11,052
| 1–3
|- align="center" bgcolor="#ffcccc"
| 5
| May 23
| @ Boston
| L 108–115
| Marques Johnson (24)
| Moncrief, Lister (8)
| Paul Pressey (4)
| Boston Garden14,890
| 1–4
|-

Player statistics

Player statistics source:

Season

Playoffs

Awards and records
 Sidney Moncrief, NBA Defensive Player of the Year Award
 Sidney Moncrief, All-NBA Second Team
 Sidney Moncrief, NBA All-Defensive First Team

Transactions

Trades

Free agents

References

See also
 1983–84 NBA season

Milwaukee Bucks seasons
Mil
Milwaukee Bucks
Milwaukee Bucks